The Triple Crown of Brazilian Football is an unofficial title given to the club that won the three most important competitions of the Brazilian football in the same year:

Achievers
Santos Futebol Clube won the three most important Brazilian competitions in 1962. In that year, it won the Campeonato Paulista, the Copa Libertadores da América and the Taça Brasil (Copa do Brasil was only established in 1989).

Cruzeiro Esporte Clube won the three most important Brazilian competitions in the same year (in 2003). In that year the Campeonato Mineiro (the state championship of the state of Minas Gerais) was contested in a single round robin format, and Cruzeiro, coached by Vanderlei Luxemburgo, won the competition without losing a single game. Also, Cruzeiro won the Copa do Brasil undefeated, beating Flamengo in the final of the tournament. The Série A was won with 31 wins, seven draws and eight defeats, totaling 100 points earned. The club scored 102 goals during the championship, and conceded 47.

Flamengo's run in 2019 brought them three important trophies, although they were not all won on a domestic level: the state championship, Campeonato Carioca, the Campeonato Brasileiro, and the Copa Libertadores. Flamengo was only the second Brazilian club after Santos in 1962 to achieve this kind of Triple Crown. The following season, Palmeiras were crowned winners of the Campeonato Paulista, Copa do Brasil and Copa Libertadores.

In 2021, Atlético Mineiro won the three main national championships of the season, the Campeonato Mineiro, the Copa do Brasil and the Campeonato Brasileiro. However, he was unable to win the continental-level triple crown after being eliminated by Palmeiras in the Copa Libertadores.

See also
 Treble (association football)
 Triple Crown (disambiguation)
 Three-peat

References

Football competitions in Brazil
Cruzeiro Esporte Clube

pt:Tríplice coroa